The Federal Prison Camp, Bryan (FPC Bryan) is a minimum-security United States federal prison for female inmates in Texas. It is operated by the Federal Bureau of Prisons, a division of the United States Department of Justice.

FPC Bryan is located 95 miles northwest of Houston.

Facility and inmate life

There are between 500-750 women at FPC Bryan at any given time. Of these 750 women only about 200 have a GED or high school diploma, and of those 200 only half have education above high school.

Notable inmates (current and former)

See also
List of U.S. federal prisons
Incarceration in the United States

References

Buildings and structures in Brazos County, Texas
Bryan
Bryan
Bryan, Texas